Karefa is an African given name and surname. Notable people with the name include:

Karefa Kargbo, Sierra Leonean politician
John Karefa-Smart (1915–2010), Sierra Leonean politician, medical doctor, and university professor
Rena Karefa-Smart (1921–2019), American theologian, university professor, ecumenical leader

African given names
Surnames of African origin